Islamic archaeology involves the recovery and scientific investigation of the material remains of past cultures that can illuminate the periods and descriptions in the Quran, and early Islam. The science of archaeology grew out of the older multi-disciplinary study known as antiquarianism. The Egyptian "Antiquities Authority" was established in 1858 and remains a government organization which serves to protect and preserve the heritage and ancient history of Egypt. 

Early pioneers in Islamic archaeology included Eduard Glaser and Alois Musil. Khaled al-Asaad was principal custodian of the Palmyra site from 1963, overseeing its elevation to a UNESCO World Heritage Site. Some of the earliest areas investigated in Saudi Arabia include Al Faw Village and Madain Saleh.  Jodi Magness has covered the archaeology of early Islamic settlement in Palestine. The Museum of Islamic Archaeology and Art of Iran was opened in 1972. It houses tools dating back 30,000 to 35,000 years and crafted by Mousterian Neanderthals in Yafteh. Among the oldest human artifacts are 9,000-year-old and animal figurines from the Sarab mound in Kermanshah Province. The Gaza Museum of Archaeology was opened in 2008.  Objects protected from display include Aphrodite in revealing gown, images of ancient deities and oil lamps featuring menorahs. Since 2016 the Al-Qasimi Professor of African and Islamic Archaeology at the University of Exeter, Timothy Insoll, has directed the Centre for Islamic Archaeology. Insoll is on the  editorial board of the Journal of Islamic Archaeology.

The oldest extant Islamic monument is The Dome of the Rock in Jerusalem which contains some of the earliest extant qurānic text, dated to 692CE. They vary from today's standard text (mainly changes from the first to the third person) and are mixed with pious inscriptions absent from the Quran. During a six-week period in 1833, Frederick Catherwood produced the first known detailed survey. Pre-Islamic In-situ archaeology includes south Arabian 4th CE  rock inscriptions that evidence fewer pagan expressions and the start in use of the monotheistic "rahmān". Fewer archaeological surveys have taken place in the Arabian peninsula and are considered taboo in Mecca (The Noble) and Medina  (The Enlightened City). There is no architecture from the time of Mohammed in either city and the battlefields of the Quran have not been unearthed. Known settlements from the time, such as Khaybar, remain uninvestigated. Archaeologial evidence for Quranic narratives yet to be uncovered include that for the ʿĀd who built monuments and strongholds at every high point and their fate evident from the remains of their dwellings.

A political dispute in the Uttar Pradesh city of Ayodhya, as noted by academic, K. K. Muhammed, has revolved around archaeological Issues:  whether an archaeological plot, believed  the temple birthplace of the Hindu deity Rama was demolished or modified to create the Babri Masjid mosque.

See also
Archaeology of Afghanistan
Archaeology of Qatar
Archaeology of Iran
Archaeology of Saudi Arabia

References

Archaeological sub-disciplines